Zuzana Lajbnerová (born 20 May 1963) is a Czech athlete. She competed in the women's heptathlon at the 1988 Summer Olympics.

References

1963 births
Living people
Athletes (track and field) at the 1988 Summer Olympics
Czech heptathletes
Olympic athletes of Czechoslovakia
Sportspeople from Hradec Králové
Universiade bronze medalists for Czechoslovakia
Universiade medalists in athletics (track and field)
Medalists at the 1987 Summer Universiade